Gillon is a surname. Notable people with this name include:
Alex Gillon (1909–2007), Australian civic and sporting administrator
Alexander Gillon (1741–1794), American merchant and seaman
Ashleigh Gillon, Australian journalist
Carmi Gillon (born 1950), Israeli politician
Cydney Gillon, American bodybuilder
Edward Thomas Gillon (1842–1896), New Zealand journalist
Ern Gillon, Australian rugby player
Gail Gillon, New Zealand child development academic
George Gillon (born 1942), British politician
Grant Gillon, New Zealand politician
Karen Gillon (born 1967), Scottish politician
John Gillon (born 1994), American basketball player
John Gillon, fictional character in 1992 sports comedy-drama film Diggstown
Mary Gillon (1898–2002), Scottish woman conductress during WWI
Paul Gillon (1926–2011), French comics artist
Peter Gillon (born 1939), Australian rower
Raanan Gillon, British professor of medical ethics
Robert Gillon (1884–1972), Belgian lawyer and politician
Steven M. Gillon, American historian
William Downe Gillon (1801–1846), Scottish politician

See also
Gillón, Spanish municipality
River Gillon, in the Dominican Republic